Fernando Jorge Barbosa Martins (born 28 January 1986), known as Capela, is a Portuguese professional footballer who plays for Académico de Viseu F.C. as a defensive midfielder.

Club career
Born in Arouca, Aveiro District, Capela started playing with local F.C. Arouca, going on to part of the squads that promoted from the regional leagues to the third division in just two years. After two more seasons in amateur football, with G.D. Milheiroense, he moved straight to the Segunda Liga after signing for Leixões SC, making his debut in the competition on 21 August 2011 in a 1–0 away win against Associação Naval 1º de Maio.

In the following years, Capela continued competing in the second tier, joining F.C. Penafiel on 11 June 2014 and scoring the game's only goal in just his third Primeira Liga appearance, at former club Arouca.

References

External links

1986 births
Living people
Sportspeople from Aveiro District
Portuguese footballers
Association football midfielders
Primeira Liga players
Liga Portugal 2 players
Segunda Divisão players
F.C. Arouca players
Leixões S.C. players
U.D. Oliveirense players
Académico de Viseu F.C. players
F.C. Penafiel players
F.C. Famalicão players
Girabola players
F.C. Bravos do Maquis players
Portuguese expatriate footballers
Expatriate footballers in Angola
Portuguese expatriate sportspeople in Angola